The 1936 Syrian general strike was a 50-day strike that was organized as a response to the policies of the French occupation of Syria and Lebanon. The strike action paralyzed the country for two months and forced France to negotiate the Franco-Syrian Treaty of Independence with the National Bloc.

Overview
On 11 January 1936, the National Bloc held a commemoration for one of its leaders, Ibrahim Hananu, who had died in November 1935. The meeting featured several speeches that lamented and attacked the French occupation. Soon thereafter the French mandate authorities closed the office of the National Bloc in Damascus, and arrested two prominent nationalist leaders from the party, Fakhri al-Baroudi and Sayf al-Din al-Ma'mun. In response, the Bloc called for strike action against the French occupation policies. The strike, which started on 20 January with work stoppages and student protests in Damascus, Homs, Hama and Aleppo, soon spread to all major towns.

Leaders from the National Bloc, including Nasib al-Bakri, Jamil Mardam Bey, Lutfi al-Haffar and Faris al-Khoury actively participated and organized demonstrations against the French occupation and the French-appointed president, Taj al-Din al-Hasani, and demanded the reinstatement of the 1930 constitution that was suspended in 1933. The League of National Action supported the strike and participated in organizing marches and protests in Damascus. The civil disobedience action paralyzed the economy and quickly brought the country to the "verge of a complete shutdown."

French response
The French High Commissioner, Damien de Martel, was urgently recalled from Beirut to Damascus to handle the situation, and General Charles Huntziger, commander of the Army of the Levant was tasked with restoring calm. Several Bloc leaders including Nasib al-Bakri and Mardam Bey were exiled, and more than 3,000 people were arrested.

In an effort to disperse the demonstrations, French troops opened fire on the protesting crowds, leaving dozens dead. However, the measures failed to quell the uprising which garnered support from other Arab countries as people protested on the streets of Iraq, Lebanon, Palestine and Jordan in solidarity with the Syrian people. The French government also came under severe pressure inside France from the leftist media and the emerging Popular Front which called for a complete re-haul of its policy in Syria and Lebanon.

Resolution
On 2 March the French authorities relented and agreed to start negotiations with the National Bloc. They also granted a general amnesty for those arrested or exiled during the crisis. The Bloc called off the strike on 6 March after the release of its arrested leaders. Later that year, a delegation from the National Bloc travelled to Paris and signed the Franco-Syrian Treaty of Independence.

References

Arab rebellions
General strikes
Syrian General Strike, 1936
1936 labor disputes and strikes
Rebellions in Mandatory Syria
Labor in Mandatory Syria
Protests in Mandatory Syria
Resistance to the French colonial empire